After Crying  is a Hungarian musical ensemble, established in 1986, which composes and performs contemporary classical music or symphonic rock.  They use instruments ranging from classical acoustical instruments like cello, trumpet, piano, flute to the instruments of a modern rock band.  They sometimes perform with traditional chamber or symphony orchestras.  Their studio albums contain numerous variations in instruments and composition.

2013 Lineup (alphabetical order)
(Hungarian names: Family names first)
Bátky-Valentin Zoltán (lead vocal, member since 2002)
Egervári Gábor (flute, narration, texts and thoughts, live sound, founding member)
Erős Csaba (piano, keyboards)
Horváth András Ádám (guitars, iPad samplers)
Madai Zsolt (drums, percussion, vibraphone, member since 1998)
Pejtsik Péter (composition, orchestration, cello, bass guitar, vocals, founding member)
Winkler Balázs (composition, orchestration, trumpet, keyboards. First appeared 1990–1991, regular member since 1992)

Discography
Opus 1 (cassette) (1989)  (cd reedition 2009)
1989 (cassette) (1989)  (cd reedition 2009)
Overground Music (1990) 
Koncert 1991 (cassette) (1991)
Megalázottak és megszomorítottak (1992) 
Föld és ég (1994) 
De Profundis (1996) 
Első évtized (1996) 
6 (1997)
Almost Pure Instrumental (1998)
Struggle for Life (2000)
Struggle for Life – essential (2000)
Bootleg Symphony (2001)
Show (2003)
Live [DVD] (2007)
Opus 1 (2009)
1989 (2009)
Creatura (2011)
XXV Anniversary Concert (2013)

References

External links
After Crying Official Website

Musical groups established in 1986
1986 establishments in Hungary